Monoplex is a genus of predatory sea snails, marine gastropod mollusks in the family Cymatiidae.

Species
Species within the genus Monoplex include:

 Monoplex amictus (Reeve, 1844)
 Monoplex aquatilis (Reeve, 1844)
 † Monoplex cecilianus (Dall, 1916) 
 † Monoplex cercadicus (Maury, 1917) 
 Monoplex comptus (A. Adams, 1855)
 Monoplex corrugatus (Lamarck, 1816)
 † Monoplex dissimilis Landau, Beu, Breitenberger & Dekkers, 2020 
 † Monoplex distortus (Brocchi, 1814) 
 † Monoplex doderleini (D'Ancona, 1873) 
 Monoplex durbanensis (E.A. Smith, 1899)
 Monoplex exaratus (Reeve, 1844)
 † Monoplex gatunicus Beu, 2010 
 Monoplex gemmatus (Reeve, 1844)
 † Monoplex gradatus Craig, Tracey & Gain, 2020 
 † Monoplex gurabonicus (Maury, 1917) 
 † Monoplex heptagonus (Brocchi, 1814) 
 Monoplex intermedius (Pease, 1869)
 † Monoplex jackwinorum Beu, 2010
 Monoplex keenae Beu, 1970
 Monoplex klenei (G.B. Sowerby III, 1889)
 Monoplex krebsii (Mörch, 1877)
 Monoplex lignarius (Broderip, 1833)
 † Monoplex longispira Beu, 2010 
 Monoplex macrodon (Valenciennes, 1832)
 Monoplex mundus (Gould, 1849)
 Monoplex nicobaricus (Röding, 1798)
 Monoplex norai (Garcia-Talavera & de Vera, 2004)
 † Monoplex panamensis Beu, 2010 
 Monoplex parthenopeus (Salis Marschlins, 1793)
 Monoplex penniketi (Beu, 1998)
 Monoplex pilearis (Linnaeus, 1758)
 † Monoplex rembangensis (Wanner & Hahn, 1935) 
 † Monoplex ritteri Schmelz, 1989 
 † Monoplex subcorrugatus (d'Orbigny, 1852) 
 Monoplex thersites (Reeve, 1844)
 Monoplex tranquebaricus (Lamarck, 1816)
 Monoplex trigonus (Gmelin, 1791)
 Monoplex turtoni (E.A. Smith, 1890)
 Monoplex vespaceus (Lamarck, 1822)
 Monoplex vestitus (Hinds, 1844)
 Monoplex wiegmanni (Anton, 1838)

Species brought into synonymy 
 Monoplex australasiae Perry, 1811: synonym of Monoplex parthenopeus (Salis Marschlins, 1793)
 Monoplex capitatus Perry, 1811: synonym of Tudicla spirillus (Linnaeus, 1767)
 Monoplex cornutus Perry, 1811: synonym of Monoplex exaratus (Reeve, 1844)
 Monoplex formosus Perry, 1811: synonym of Ranularia gutturnia (Röding, 1798)
 Monoplex martinianus (d'Orbigny, 1847): synonym of Monoplex pilearis (Linnaeus, 1758)
 Monoplex oboesa Perry, 1811: synonym of Ranularia oboesa (Perry, 1811)

References

 Dall W.H. 1889. Reports on the results of dredging, under the supervision of Alexander Agassiz, in the Gulf of Mexico (1877-78) and in the Caribbean Sea (1879-80), by the U.S. Coast Survey Steamer "Blake", Lieut.-Commander C.D. Sigsbee, U.S.N., and Commander J.R. Bartlett, U.S.N., commanding. XXIX. Report on the Mollusca. Part 2, Gastropoda and Scaphopoda. Bulletin of the Museum of Comparative Zoölogy at Harvard College, 18: 1-492, pls. 10-40
 Beu A.G. 2010 [August]. Neogene tonnoidean gastropods of tropical and South America: contributions to the Dominican Republic and Panama Paleontology Projects and uplift of the Central American Isthmus. Bulletins of American Paleontology 377-378: 550 pp, 79 pls

Cymatiidae
Gastropod genera